The Swedish Shoe and Leather Workers' Union (SSoL) was a trade union representing workers in the leather industry in Sweden.

The union was founded on 13 August 1888 in Stockholm, as the Swedish Shoemakers' Union, with an initial 366 members.  It affiliated to the Swedish Trade Union Confederation in 1899, and membership reached 5,102 by 1907.

In 1962, the union gained about 1,100 members from the dissolved Swedish Saddlemakers' and Upholsterers' Union, and the leather workers from the dissolved United Unions, taking its membership to a peak of 15,450.  However, it then declined, in line with employment in the industry, and by 1972 membership was down to 8,083.  The following year, it merged with the Swedish Clothing Workers' Union and the Swedish Textile Workers' Union, to form the Swedish Textile, Garment and Leather Workers' Union.

References

1888 establishments in Sweden
1973 disestablishments in Sweden
Swedish Trade Union Confederation
Footwear industry trade unions
Leather industry trade unions
Trade unions in Sweden
Trade unions established in 1888
Trade unions disestablished in 1973